Hubbell is a surname of English, Norman and Germanic origin.  Hubbell is the 5667th most common family name in the United States according to the U.S. Census.  Genealogical sources indicate a Hubbell residing in Worcestershire, England circa 1530.

 Carl Hubbell (1903–1988), American baseball player
 Don Lorenzo Hubbell (or John) (1853–1930), American trader, politician
 Edwin N. Hubbell (born 1815, date of death unknown), American politician
 Harvey Hubbell (1857–1927), American inventor, entrepreneur, industrialist
 James Hubbell (born 1931), American artist, sculptor and architect
 James Randolph Hubbell (1824–1890), American politician
 Jay Abel Hubbell (1829–1900), American politician
 John H. Hubbell (born 1925), American radiation physicist
 John Raymond Hubbell (1879–1954), American composer
 Keiffer Hubbell, American ice dancer
 Levi Hubbell (1808-1876), American politician
 Levi M. Hubbell (1826-1910), American politician
 Madison Hubbell, American ice dancer
 Richard W. Hubbell (1840-1910), American politician
 Stephen P. Hubbell (born 1942), University of Georgia ecologist
 Sue Hubbell (born 1935), American author
 Wayne L. Hubbell (born 1943), American scientist
 Webster Hubbell (born 1949), American lawyer, politician
 Will Hubbell (author and illustrator)
 William Spring Hubbell (1801–1873), American politician
 William Stone Hubbell (1837–1930), U.S. Army captain, Medal of Honor recipient

See also
 Hubbell (disambiguation)
 Hubble (disambiguation), variant of Hubbell

External links
Carl Hubbell official site
Hubbell Branch, New Orleans Public Library
Hubbell Family Historical Society
Hubbell Trading Post National Historic Site

Surnames from given names